Sequence organizers are a type of graphic organizer that help students to see the sequential relationship between events in a text. They can show a process or portray an event sequence in a simplified manner. They can help students identify cause-and-effect relationships. A graphic organizer can be also known as a knowledge map, a concept map, a story map, a cognitive organizer, an advance organizer, or a concept diagram. They are used as a communication tool to employ visual symbols to express knowledge, concepts, thoughts or ideas, and the relationships between them.

Types 

 Topic or knowledge maps visually depict where items of information exist.
 Concept maps illustrate relationships between two or more concepts.
 Story maps identify the elements of a story and the main storyline.
 Webs show how information categories relate to one another.
 Mind maps visually represent central ideas surrounded by connected topics and subtopics.

Teaching 

When students read a text that outlines a story, process or series of events, it can be useful to put the information in a sequence. Breaking down information into sections can make it easier to understand as a whole. Moreover, large pictures help emphasize the core meaning along with practical demonstrations. A graphic organizer can be used as a teaching tool in two ways:

 From graphic organizer to text – A completed sequence organizer is used to create a piece of writing based on the information it contains.
 From text to graphic organizer – A sequence organizer is used to simplify, in note form, events in a sequential order. This is often used by teachers to check student's comprehension of a text.

More ideas 

Students who need more help can be provided with key events already written in the left hand arrows.

If students are reading different sections of the same text, such as a jigsaw activity, they should complete a particular portion of their organizer. When the classmates assemble, they can exchange their portions to make notes of important information of other sections.

Organizers can be used as a platform to prepare a rough draft for a narrative text, or a summarize review of sequential information from more than one textual source or learning experience.

References 

Educational technology